The women's 100 metre freestyle competition at the 2006 Pan Pacific Swimming Championships took place on August 18 at the Saanich Commonwealth Place.  The last champion was Natalie Coughlin of US.

This race consisted of two lengths of the pool, both lengths being in freestyle.

Records
Prior to this competition, the existing world and Pan Pacific records were as follows:

Results
All times are in minutes and seconds.

Heats
The first round was held on August 18, at 10:00.

B Final 
The B final was held on August 18, at 18:00.

A Final 
The A final was held on August 18, at 18:00.

References

2006 Pan Pacific Swimming Championships
2006 in women's swimming